The Sarthe is a  river in western France. Together with the river Mayenne it forms the river Maine, which is a tributary to the river Loire.

Its source is in the Orne department, near Moulins-la-Marche. It flows generally southwest, through the following departments and towns:

Orne: Le Mêle-sur-Sarthe, Alençon 
Sarthe: Fresnay-sur-Sarthe, Beaumont-sur-Sarthe, Le Mans, Sablé-sur-Sarthe 
Maine-et-Loire: Châteauneuf-sur-Sarthe, Tiercé, Angers

Its main tributaries are the Loir and the Huisne from the left, and the Vaige, the Erve and the Vègre from the right.

Navigation 
The Sarthe has 20 weirs and locks. The channel is well marked and navigation is straightforward, except for the risk of shoals in certain sections.

References

External links 

River Sarthe with further maps and expanded details (by the author of 'Inland Waterways of France')
Navigation details for 80 French rivers and canals (French waterways website section)

Rivers of France
Rivers of Maine-et-Loire
Rivers of Orne
Rivers of Sarthe
Rivers of Normandy
Rivers of Pays de la Loire
Pays de la Loire region articles needing translation from French Wikipedia